Pavel Kuka (born 19 July 1968) is a Czech former professional footballer who played as a forward.

Born in Prague, Kuka started and finished his career at Slavia Prague, playing with the club from 1989–93 and then from 2000–05. He has also played for 1. FC Kaiserslautern (1994–98), 1. FC Nürnberg (1998–99), and VfB Stuttgart (1999–2000). For the Czech Republic national team, Kuka played 63 times, scoring 22 goals and was part of the runner-up squad at Euro 96 and also took part at Euro 2000. Kuka also played 24 times, scoring seven goals, for Czechoslovakia.

After his retirement in May 2005 he briefly worked as a manager in FK Marila Příbram (another Gambrinus league team) and then became football agent. In 2008, he was a sports executive at FK Viktoria Žižkov.

Honours
1. FC Kaiserslautern
 2. Bundesliga: 1996–97
 Bundesliga: 1997–98; runner-up: 1993–94
 DFB-Pokal: 1995–96

Czech Republic
 UEFA European Championship runner-up: 1996
 FIFA Confederations Cup Third place: 1997

References

External links
 

1968 births
Living people
Footballers from Prague
Association football forwards
Czech footballers
Czech Republic international footballers
Czechoslovak footballers
Czechoslovakia international footballers
Dual internationalists (football)
Czech expatriate footballers
1. FC Kaiserslautern players
1. FC Nürnberg players
VfB Stuttgart players
FK Hvězda Cheb players
SK Slavia Prague players
Czech First League players
Bundesliga players
2. Bundesliga players
Expatriate footballers in Germany
UEFA Euro 1996 players
1997 FIFA Confederations Cup players
UEFA Euro 2000 players
Czech expatriate sportspeople in Germany